Miss Charity is a 1921 British silent romance film directed by Edwin J. Collins and starring Margery Meadows, Dick Webb and Joan Lockton. It was based on the 1908 novel by Keble Howard, who praised the final film.

Cast
 Margery Meadows ...  Charity Couchman 
 Dick Webb ...  John Coghill 
 Joan Lockton ...  Philippa 
 Ralph Forster ...  Rev Walter Couchman 
 James Read ...  Crazy Jim

References

External links
Miss Charity on BFI website

1921 films
1920s romance films
British romance films
Films directed by Edwin J. Collins
Films based on British novels
British silent feature films
British black-and-white films
1920s English-language films
1920s British films